11 Minutes is a 2015 thriller film written and directed by Jerzy Skolimowski. It stars Richard Dormer, Paulina Chapko, Wojciech Mecwaldowski, Andrzej Chyra, Dawid Ogrodnik, Agata Buzek, Piotr Glowacki, Mateusz Kościukiewicz, Ifi Ude, Jan Nowicki, Anna Maria Buczek, and Lukasz Sikora. Set in Warsaw, it tells the story of multiple people's lives over the course of eleven minutes in a single day. The film had its world premiere in the Competition section at the 72nd Venice International Film Festival on 9 September 2015. It was selected as the Polish entry for the Best Foreign Language Oscar at the 88th Academy Awards, but it was not nominated.

Plot
A contemporary big city and a group of its inhabitants, whose lives are intertwined with each other. The same 11 minutes from the lives of different characters presented in parallel stories: an obsessively jealous husband, his wife-actress, a sneaky Hollywood director, a drug courier, a hot dog vendor with an obscure past, a girl with a beloved dog, a frustrated student on a risky mission, a mountaineer cleaning hotel windows, an ambulance crew, a group of nuns and an old painter. Before the last second of the eleventh minute, their fate is linked by an event that will definitely affect their lives.

Cast

Production
Jerzy Skolimowski described the film as "an answer to the Hollywood action movies." The film was primarily shot in Warsaw. Additional filming took place in Dublin, as well as the Alvernia Studios near Cracow.

Release
The film had its world premiere in the Competition section at the 72nd Venice International Film Festival on 9 September 2015. It was also screened at the Toronto International Film Festival, the BFI London Film Festival, the Gdynia Film Festival, the Geneva International Film Festival, the Lisbon & Estoril Film Festival, the Cork Film Festival, the Camerimage, and the Trieste Film Festival. It was released in Poland on 23 October 2015.

Reception

Critical reception
On review aggregator website Rotten Tomatoes, the film has an approval rating of 67% based on 15 reviews, and a weighted average rating of 5.6/10. On Metacritic, the film has a score 51 out of 100, based on 12 critics, indicating "mixed or average reviews".

Chuck Bowen of Slant Magazine gave the film 3 out of 4 stars, writing, "The directorial ingenuity of 11 Minutes is so evident and flamboyant that it's tempting to overlook the accomplishments of Skolimowski’s script, which abounds in shorthand and overheated implication." He added, "The film's final Rube Goldberg-ian flourish refutes the banal humanity of many multiple-character studies, convincingly insisting that only death shall bring us together, unifying our vastly differing gulfs of emotional experience." David Rooney of The Hollywood Reporter described the film as "an empty feat of technical virtuosity driven by a bleakly obvious vision of the murky morality of the post-9/11 world."

Accolades

See also
 List of submissions to the 88th Academy Awards for Best Foreign Language Film
 List of Polish submissions for the Academy Award for Best Foreign Language Film

References

External links

 

2015 films
2015 thriller films
Irish thriller films
2010s Polish-language films
2010s English-language films
English-language Polish films
English-language Irish films
Polish thriller films
Polish multilingual films
Hyperlink films
Nonlinear narrative films
Films directed by Jerzy Skolimowski
Films shot in Warsaw
Films shot in the Republic of Ireland
Films with screenplays by Jerzy Skolimowski
2015 multilingual films